Mixx FM 101.3 is a commercial radio station broadcasting from Horsham, Victoria, Australia. It is currently owned by Ace Radio & broadcasts A Contemporary Hits Radio (CHR) format. It features both locally produced content & nationally syndicated content from both NOVA Entertainment & Grant Broadcasters. They have two repeaters, one at Nhill (94.5FM), & Ararat (98.5FM).

References

Radio stations in Victoria
Radio stations established in 1996
Ace Radio